William Wakefield was a soldier.

William Wakefield may also refer to:

William Wakefield (MP) for Leicester (UK Parliament constituency)
William Wakefield (baseball)
William Wakefield (cricketer)
William Wakefield (banker)

See also